The Cunning Little Vixen (original title Příhody lišky Bystroušky or Tales of Vixen Sharp-Ears in English), is a three-act Czech-language opera by Leoš Janáček completed in 1923 to a libretto the composer himself adapted from a novella by Rudolf Těsnohlídek.

Name
The opera's libretto was adapted by the composer from a 1920 serialized novella, Liška Bystrouška, by Rudolf Těsnohlídek, which was first published in the newspaper Lidové noviny (with illustrations by Stanislav Lolek). For the title of the opera, Příhody means tales; lišky is the genitive of vixen. Bystroušky, still genitive, is the pun sharp, having the double meaning of pointed, like fox ears, and clever. The opera first became familiar outside Czechoslovakia in a 1927 German adaptation by Max Brod who provided the new name Das schlaue Füchslein, by which Germans still know it and which in English means The Cunning Little Vixen.

Composition
When Janáček discovered Těsnohlídek's comic-strip-inspired story and decided to turn it into an opera, in 1921, he began work by meeting with the author and studying the animals. With this understanding of the characters involved, his own 70 years of life experience, and an undying, unrequited love for the much younger, married Kamila Stösslová, he began work on the opera. He transformed the originally comedic cartoon into a philosophical reflection on the cycle of life by ending with the death of the titular Vixen; as with other operas by elderly composers, this one depicts life leading to a return to simplicity. Work was completed in 1922-23 and the first edition was published the next year in Vienna by Universal Edition. The premiere took place on 6 November 1924 in National Theatre Brno conducted by František Neumann, with Ota Zítek as director and Eduard Milén as stage designer.

The opera incorporates Moravian folk music and rhythms as it recounts the life of a clever (alternative reading: sharp-eared) fox and accompanying wildlife, as well as a few humans, and their small adventures while traversing their lifecycles. Described as a comic opera, it has nonetheless been noted to contain a serious theme. Interpretations of the work remain varied, ranging from children's entertainment to tragedy.

Performance history
The first non-Czech performance took place in Mainz, Germany, in 1927 in  an adaptation by Max Brod under the title Das schlaue Füchslein. Brod described the opera as a "dream of the eternity of nature and love-lust", but his version substantially changed the story-line. It was not successful.  In 1956 Walter Felsenstein created a performing version closer to the original, which was successfully performed at the Komische Oper in Berlin. In 1965, Felsenstein made this a Deutscher Fernsehfunk movie with Irmgard Arnold in the title role, but retaining Brod's Das schlaue Füchslein title. 

The opera received its Italian premiere at La Scala in 1958 with Mariella Adani in the title role. 
The work was first staged in England in 1961 by the Sadler's Wells Opera Company (now the English National Opera) with June Bronhill in the title, albeit with a tenor Fox (Kevin Miller); the director was Colin Graham, with conductor Colin Davis, and scenery and costume designs by Barry Kay. A production by David Pountney was mounted by the three UK national companies in the 1980s, first being seen with Scottish Opera at the 1980 Edinburgh Festival, then Welsh National Opera in London the following year and finally with English National Opera in June 1988; nearly 40 years on Pountney supervised a revival by Welsh National Opera in Cardiff and on tour. In 1981, the New York City Opera mounted a production in English based on images created by Maurice Sendak and conducted by Michael Tilson Thomas in his company debut. It starred soprano Gianna Rolandi as Vixen Sharp-Ears and baritone Richard Cross as the Forester. Glyndebourne Festival Opera staged it in 2012, directed by Melly Still, and a revival was included in the Glyndebourne Festival for 2016 with Christopher Purves as the Forester and Elena Tsallagova as the Vixen, conductor Jakub Hrůša and the London Philharmonic Orchestra. In May 2014 the Cleveland Orchestra, conducted by Franz Welser-Möst, performed an innovative version directed by Yuval Sharon. This production returned the opera to its roots by utilizing animation and hand drawn video sets by the artists Bill Barminski and Christopher Louie of Walter Robot Studios.  The production featured the use of hole-in-the-wall carnival cutouts to place the singers' heads on the animated bodies of the animal characters.

Roles

{| class="wikitable"
!Role
!Voice type
!Premiere cast, 6 November 1924(Conductor: František Neumann)
|-
|Sharp-Ears (Bystrouška) the Vixen
|soprano
|Hana Hrdličková-Zavřelová
|-
|Gold-Stripe (Zlatohřbítek) the Fox
|soprano or mezzo-soprano
|Božena Snopková
|-
|Forester (Revírník)
|baritone
|Arnold Flögl
|-
|Parson
|bass
|
|-
|Schoolmaster
|tenor
|Antonín Pelc
|-
|Harašta, a poultry dealer
|bass
|Ferdinand Pour
|-
!colspan=3|Supporting roles:
|-
|Forester's wife
|contralto
|-
|Lapák, a dog
|mezzo-soprano
|Marta Dobruská
|-
|Chocholka, a hen
|soprano
|Vlasta Kubiková
|-
|Rooster
|soprano
|
|-
!colspan=3|Bit roles:
|-
|Pepík, Forester's grandson
|soprano
|Bozena Polaková
|-
|Frantík, Pepík's friend
|soprano
|Milada Rabasová
|-
|Pásek, an innkeeper|tenor
|Bedřich Zavadil
|-
|Mrs. Páskova, Pásek's wife|soprano
|Jelena Jezicová
|-
|Young Vixen Bystrouška
|child soprano
|
|-
|Cricket
|child soprano
|
|-
|Young Frog
|child soprano
|
|-
|Grasshopper
|child soprano
|
|-
|Jay
|soprano
|
|-
|Owl
|contralto
|
|-
|Woodpecker
|contralto
|
|-
|Mosquito
|tenor
|
|-
|Badger
|bass
|
|-
!colspan=3|Chorus roles:
|-
|Hens
|women's chorus (SA)
|
|-
|Forest Creatures
|women's chorus (SA)
|
|-
|Voice of the Forest
|mixed chorus (SAATTBB)
|
|-
|Fox Cubs
|[children's] chorus
|
|-
!colspan=3|Ballet roles:
|-
| colspan="4"|Blue Dragonfly, Midges, Apparition of the Vixen as a girl, Hedgehog, Squirrels, a Young Vixen, Forest Creatures
|}

According to instructions in the score, four pairs of roles may be performed by the same singer: Parson/Badger, Schoolmaster/Mosquito, Forester's Wife/Owl, and Rooster/Jay. Janácek later required that Lapák, Rooster, and Chocholka be sung by "girls approximately fifteen years old."

Synopsis

Act 1
In the forest, the animals and insects are playing and dancing. The forester enters and lies down against a tree for a nap. A curious vixen cub (often sung by a young girl), inquisitively chases a frog right into the lap of the surprised forester who forcibly takes the vixen home as a pet. Time passes (in the form of an orchestral interlude) and we see the vixen, now grown up into a young adult (and sung by a soprano) tied up in the forester's yard with the conservative old dachshund. Fed up with life in confinement, the vixen chews through her rope, attacks the rooster and hen, kills the other chickens, jumps over the fence and runs off to freedom.

Act 2
The vixen takes over a badger's home and kicks him out. At the inn, the parson, the forester, and the schoolmaster drink and talk about their mutual infatuation with the gypsy girl Terynka. The drunken schoolmaster leaves the inn and mistakes a sunflower behind which the vixen is hiding for Terynka, professing his devotion to her. The forester, also on his way home, sees the vixen and fires two shots at her, sending her running. Later, the vixen, coming into her adulthood, meets a charming boy fox, and they retire to the badger's home. An unexpected pregnancy and a forest full of gossipy creatures necessitate their marriage, which rounds out the act.

Act 3
The poacher Harašta is engaged to Terynka and is out hunting in preparation for their marriage. He sets a fox trap, which the numerous fox and vixen cubs mock. Harašta, watching from a distance, shoots and kills the vixen, sending her children running. At Harašta's wedding, the forester sees the vixen's fur, which Harašta gave to Terynka as a wedding present, and flees to the forest to reflect. He returns to the place where he met the vixen, and sits at the tree, grieving the loss of both the vixen and Terynka. His grief grows until, just as in the beginning of the opera, a frog unexpectedly jumps in his lap, the grandson of the one who did so in Act 1. This reassurance of the cycle of death bringing new life gives his heart a deep peace.

Music

Apart from The Excursions of Mr. Brouček, this is Janáček's lightest opera, and, despite the titular vixen's death at the end of the work, it stands in contrast to the often brutally serious nature of operas such as Jenůfa and Káťa Kabanová. In The Cunning Little Vixen, the composer moved away from the more conversational style of previous and subsequent operas in favor of a more folk-like style, and wove into its fabric some of his most experimental opera concepts (ballet, mime, and orchestral interludes).

Janáček based The Cunning Little Vixens tonality on modes (similarly to much output during his last decade), expanding the music's harmonic range through the utilisation of the seventh and ninth chords. The composition makes frequent use of folk-influenced rhythms and "sčasovka" (personally-coined term for a short motif), while it has been noted to contain similarities to the music of French composer Claude Debussy.

At Janáček's request, the final scene from  The Cunning Little Vixen was performed at his funeral in 1928.

Recordings
 Prague National Theatre Chorus and Orchestra/Bohumil Gregor (Supraphon SU 3071-2612)
 Royal Opera House Chorus and Orchestra/Simon Rattle, recorded 1991 (Chandos 3101(2), sung in English)
 Wiener Staatsopernchor & Philharmoniker/Charles Mackerras, recorded 1981 (Decca 417 129-2)
 Orchestre de Paris/Charles Mackerras, video recorded 1995 (Kultur D4544, ; Medici Arts)
 London Symphony Orchestra/Simon Rattle, 2020 (LSO Live, LSO0850)

Arrangements
 Orchestral suite of the opera by Václav Talich, performed by Czech Philharmonic Orchestra, conductor Václav Talich
 Orchestral suite of the opera by Václav Talich, performed by Boston Symphony Orchestra, conductor Erich Leinsdorf
 Orchestral suite of the opera by Václav Talich, performed by Czech Philharmonic Orchestra, conductor Charles Mackerras
 Entr'actes from the opera, arrangement by František Jílek, performed by Brno Philharmonic Orchestra, conductor Jakub Hrůša
 Music from the opera for brass quintet, arrangement by František Jílek, performed by Brno Brass Quintet, ar Vlastimil Bialas
 Cut version of the opera for an animated film, arrangement by Kent Nagano, in English, texted Geoff Dunbar, performed by soloists, Berlin German Symphony Orchestra, conductor Kent Nagano

Films
 In 1965, Walter Felsenstein directed a filmed version in German (Das schlaue Füchslein).
 In 2003, an animated version was produced by the BBC.

Adaptations
Ursula Dubosarsky's 2018 novel for children, Brindabella, is based on Rudolf Těsnohlídek's Vixen Sharp Ears, the source story of the Cunning Little Vixen, relocated in the Australian bush, with the role of the Vixen played by a kangaroo.

References
Notes

Sources
 Holden, Amanda (ed.) (2001), The New Penguin Opera Guide, New York: Penguin Putnam. 
Janáček, Leoš (Timothy Cheek) (2004), The Janáček Opera Libretti: Káťa Kabanová, Scarecrow Press.
 Kennedy, Michael and Joyce. Oxford Concise Dictionary of Music (5th edition). Oxford: Oxford University Press, 2007. .
 Sokol, Martin L. (1981), The New York City Opera – An American Adventure, Macmillan. 
 Warrack, John and West, Ewan (1992), The Oxford Dictionary of Opera'', 
Zemanová, Mirka (2002), Janáček: A Composer's Life, University Press of New England.

External links
 Gavin Plumley's Leoš Janáček site, information on The Cunning Little Vixen
 Synopsis of The Cunning Little Vixen from the English Touring Opera
 Synopsis of The Cunning Little Vixen from the Royal Opera House
 

Czech-language operas
Fictional foxes
Operas by Leoš Janáček
Operas
Operas based on comics
1924 operas
Anthropomorphic foxes